Dr. David Dickson Sloan Farm is a historic plantation house and complex located near Garland, Sampson County, North Carolina.   The house was built about 1849, and is a two-story, five bay, Greek Revival style frame dwelling. It has a brick pier foundation, low hipped roof, and three-bay pedimented portico supported by Doric order columns. The interior follows a central hall plan. Also on the property are the contributing cook's house (c. 1849), potato cellar (c. 1849), grape arbor, paling fence, garage, and 11 archaeological sites associated with former outbuildings.

It was added to the National Register of Historic Places in 1986.

References

Plantation houses in North Carolina
Houses on the National Register of Historic Places in North Carolina
Greek Revival houses in North Carolina
Houses completed in 1849
Houses in Sampson County, North Carolina
National Register of Historic Places in Sampson County, North Carolina
1849 establishments in North Carolina